The 1956 Drexel Dragons football team represented the Drexel Institute of Technology (renamed Drexel University in 1970) as an independent during the 1956 NCAA College Division football season.  Eddie Allen was the team's head coach. Left guard Vince Vidas was awarded first string on the Little All-America college football team for the second consecutive year.

Schedule

Roster

References

Drexel
Drexel Dragons football seasons
Drexel Dragons football